The Mound Builders were members of various indigenous North American cultures who constructed earthwork mounds.

Mound builder or mound builders may refer to:

 Southwestern Moundbuilders, athletic teams representing Southwestern College
 Mound-builder (bird), or Megapode, birds in the family Megapodiidae
 Mound-building termites, a group of termite species that live in mounds
 Mound-building mouse or steppe mouse, a species of rodent